The 1963 Mississippi State Bulldogs football team represented Mississippi State University during the 1963 NCAA University Division football season. Although the Bulldogs were picked to come in last in the SEC in the preseason, they finished 4–1–2 in the conference and qualified for the Liberty Bowl, the first nationally televised game in school history. The Liberty Bowl, played in 15-degree weather, was described by longtime radio broadcaster Jack Cristil as "colder than a pawnbroker's heart." Head coach Paul Davis was named SEC Coach of the Year in honor of the team's surprise success.

Schedule

References

Mississippi State
Mississippi State Bulldogs football seasons
Liberty Bowl champion seasons
Mississippi State Bulldogs football